Pandit Prateek Chaudhuri (7 September 1971 – 6 May 2021) son of Padmabhushan Pandit Debu Chaudhuri, was an eminent Indian classical sitarist of the Senia Gharana (school) and graded as a "Top Class" Artist of India by the Radio & National Television, Government of India. He was also associated as a Professor with the Faculty of Music, University of Delhi, India.

Biography
He initiated his musical training under the tutelage of his father Pandit Debu Chaudhuri and also from his Father's Guru Ustad Mushtaq Ali Khan Sahab.

Discography
 Prateek Chaudhuri - Sitar,
 Debu Chaudhuri And Prateek Chaudhuri Sitar

Death 
Prateek Chaudhuri died of COVID-19 on 6 May 2021, in Delhi. This took place only five days after his father had passed from a covid-related illness on May 1st.

Publications
 Plucked Instruments of Northern India with Special Reference to Sitar, Sanjay Prakashan-2005, New Delhi, India
 Indian Music. , Sanjay Prakashan-2005, New Delhi, India.

References

External links
 https://web.archive.org/web/20160304110906/http://www.saregama.com/album/prateek-chaudhuri-sitar_102582
 http://www.saregama.com/album/debu-chaudhuri-and-prateek-chaudhuri-sitar_57162
 http://www.thehindu.com/features/friday-review/sitar-and-its-gharanas/article6887092.ece

Sitar players
Delhi University
1971 births
2021 deaths
People from Delhi
Deaths from the COVID-19 pandemic in India